Fabio Fognini was the defending champion, but lost in the semifinals to Roberto Bautista Agut.
Bautista Agut went on to win the title, defeating Lukáš Rosol in the final, 6–3, 4–6, 6–2.

Seeds
The top four seeds receive a bye into the second round. 

 Fabio Fognini (semifinals)
 Mikhail Youzhny (semifinals)
 Roberto Bautista Agut (champion)
 Feliciano López (quarterfinals)
 Philipp Kohlschreiber (second round)
 Guillermo García López (quarterfinals)
 Santiago Giraldo (quarterfinals)
 Federico Delbonis (quarterfinals)

Draw

Finals

Top half

Bottom half

Qualifying

Seeds

 Facundo Bagnis (first round)
 Marco Cecchinato (qualified)
 Marsel İlhan (second round)
 Gastão Elias (first round)
 Mate Delić (qualified)
 Louk Sorensen (qualifying competition, Lucky loser)
 Yann Marti (qualified)
 Matthias Bachinger (first round)

Qualifiers

Lucky losers

Qualifying draw

First qualifier

Second qualifier

Third qualifier

Fourth qualifier

References

External links
 Main draw
 Qualifying draw

Stuttgart Open Singles
Singles 2014